Protogamasellus is a genus of mites in the family Ascidae.

Species
 Protogamasellus angustiventris (Athias Henriot, 1961)      
 Protogamasellus ascleronodulus Shcherbak & Petrova, 1987      
 Protogamasellus biscleronodulus Shcherbak & Petrova, 1987      
 Protogamasellus cognatus (Athias Henriot, 1961)      
 Protogamasellus elongatus Shcherbak & Petrova, 1987      
 Protogamasellus evansi (Karg, 2000)      
 Protogamasellus hibernicus Evans, 1982      
 Protogamasellus indica Bhattacharyya, Sanyal & Bhattacharya, 2000
 Protogamasellus keralaensis Bhattacharyya, Sanyal & Bhattacharya, 2000      
 Protogamasellus longipellis (Karg, 2000)      
 Protogamasellus massula (Athias Henriot, 1961)      
 Protogamasellus mica (Athias Henriot, 1961)      
 Protogamasellus minimus Jordaan, 1988      
 Protogamasellus minor      
 Protogamasellus paradioscorus Nasr, Afifi & Hassan, 1988      
 Protogamasellus primitivus Karg, 1962      
 Protogamasellus scuticalis Genis, Loots & Ryke, 1967      
 Protogamasellus similiscuticalis Bhattacharyya, Sanyal & Bhattacharya, 2000      
 Protogamasellus singularis (Karg, 1962)      
 Protogamasellus sternalis Nasr, Afifi & Hassan, 1988

References

Ascidae